Jacob Solomon Olschwang (4 May 1840 – 17 January 1896), also known by the acronym Yashbiel, was a Russian writer and Hebraist.

Biography
Jacob Solomon Levin was born to a notable Ḥasidic family in Kokhanovo, Mogilev, a descendant of David Conforte. He received a thorough Jewish education, and studied Talmud and Halakha, the Zohar and various other Kabbalistic works. He then went to Kovno, where he studied at the yeshiva of Navyazki. In 1862 he settled in Friedrichstadt, Courland, where he joined the circle of the Maskilim and in a short time was able to write Hebrew well. He changed his family name to Olschwang when he moved to Kremenchuk in 1866.

He contributed numerous articles to Ha-Melitz (from 1860), Ha-Shaḥar, Ha-Boḳer Or, and other Hebrew periodicals. Among Olschwang's writings are "Avot de-Kartina" (in Ha-Melitz, 1868) and "Haggadah shel Pesaḥ" (in Ha-Shaḥar, 1877), both satirical sketches of Jewish life in Russia.

References
 

1840 births
1896 deaths
Hebrew-language writers
Jewish writers from the Russian Empire
Male writers from the Russian Empire
People of the Haskalah
People from Orshansky Uyezd